Captain William Melville Alexander  (8 November 1897 – 4 October 1988) was a Canadian First World War flying ace, officially credited with 22 aerial victories.

World War I service
Having turned 18 in late 1915 Alexander was keen to learn to fly, but both the Curtis and Wright Brothers flying schools were at full capacity, so he travelled to San Antonio, Texas, to enter the Stinson Flying School on 6 February 1916. He received just 3½ hours instruction in a Wright Model B before passing his flying test and was awarded Aero Club of America Certificate No. 447. He then returned to Ottawa where on 23 March 1916 he was appointed a flight sub-lieutenant (on probation) in the Royal Naval Air Service. He received further training, travelled to England, and his period of probation came to an end on 9 November 1916.

On 3 December 1916 Alexander was posted to No. 3 (Naval) Wing in France, to fly the Sopwith 1½ Strutter two-seater. However, after only four months No. 3 Wing was disbanded, and on 26 April 1917 Alexander was posted to the newly formed No. 10 (Naval) Squadron, to fly the Sopwith Triplane single-seat fighter as a part of Canadian ace Raymond Collishaw's "B" ('Black') Flight".

His first aerial victory came on 2 June 1917, shared with Flight Lieutenant Collishaw and Flight Sub-Lieutenants Ellis Reid and Gerald Nash. He gained seven more solo victories by the end of July, also being promoted flight lieutenant on 30 June.

In August 1917 No. 10 (Naval) began to receive the Sopwith Camel fighter, and Alexander gained his first victory in this type on 16 August, but next two victories in August were gained in the Triplane. On 27 August he was appointed an acting flight commander, with seniority from 3 August.

His award of the Distinguished Service Cross was gazetted on 14 September 1917. His citation read:
Flight Lieutenant (Acting Flight Commander) William Melville Alexander, RNAS.
"On 16 August 1917, he attacked at about 3,000 feet two hostile scouts, one of which, after a short combat, fell completely out of control. On 20 August 1917, while returning from patrol, he observed three enemy scouts. These he pursued until they turned to fight. One of the scouts he shot down completely out of control, and the remaining two dived away. On 21 August 1917 while on an offensive patrol, he attacked and drove down completely out of control an enemy scout, which was attacking another member of his patrol. Flight Lieutenant Alexander has at all times shown the greatest bravery and determination."

Alexander gained one more victory in a Camel on 23 September, then returned to Canada on leave from mid-October to December 1917, before returning to the front with his acting rank made substantive on 28 December. Between 23 January and 27 May Alexander gained ten more aerial victories. On 1 April 1918, the Royal Naval Air Service (RNAS) was merged with the Army's Royal Flying Corps (RFC) to form the Royal Air Force and No. 10 (Naval) Squadron RNAS was renamed No. 210 Squadron RAF. On 17 April 1918 the Commanding Officer of No. 210 Squadron recommended Alexander for a second Distinguished Service Cross, but this was not forthcoming. Alexander completed four hundred and sixty-five hours of war-time flying before he was returned to the Home Establishment in May 1918. He became Flight Commander of the Fighter Defence Flight at RAF Walmer His war time tally consisted of five aircraft destroyed, and 17 'out of control' victories, one shared.

On 23 August 1918, Alexander, then commanding a Camel flight based at Walmer, was recommended for promotion to major (a squadron commander's rank), but again was turned down. He was finally transferred to the RAF's unemployed list on 29 September 1919.

List of aerial victories

Notes

References
Notes

Bibliography
 

1897 births
1988 deaths
People from Toronto
Canadian World War I flying aces
Canadian recipients of the Distinguished Service Cross (United Kingdom)
Royal Naval Air Service aviators
Royal Air Force officers
Royal Naval Air Service personnel of World War I
Royal Air Force personnel of World War I